Podlubovo is a rural locality (a village) and the administrative centre of Podlubovsky Selsoviet, Karaidelsky District, Bashkortostan, Russia. The population was 427 as of 2010. There are 7 streets.

Geography 
Podlubovo is located 49 km southwest of Karaidel (the district's administrative centre) by road. Kuyanchi is the nearest rural locality.

References 

Rural localities in Karaidelsky District